James Charles Bethke (born November 5, 1946) is an American former Major League Baseball pitcher.

He was drafted by the New York Mets in 1964.  He only played one season in his career, which was 1965 with the Mets.  His career statistics are 25 games played (all of which he entered in relief and 12 of which he finished), 19 strikeouts, a 4.28 earned run average, and a 2–0 win–loss record.

He was the youngest player in the major leagues at the time in 1965 at age 18.

External links
Jim Bethke's statistics and bio at Baseball Reference.
Jim Bethke's statistics and bio at Baseball Almanac.

Major League Baseball pitchers
Living people
New York Mets players
1946 births
Baseball players from Nebraska
People from Falls City, Nebraska
Cocoa Rookie League Mets players